Lalla Hoby is a 1996 Moroccan comedy film directed by Mohamed Abderrahman Tazi. It is the sequel to In Search of My Wife's Husband.

Synopsis 
After a rash decision, Hadj Benmoussa sets off for Europe and embarks on an adventure in attempt to find his ex-wife and her new husband in order to remarry her.

Cast 

 Hamidou
 Amina Rachid
 Naïma Lamcherki
 Ahmed Talh El Alj
 Samya Akariou
 Pierre Lekeux

References

External links 
 

1996 films
Moroccan comedy films